Somerville College Boat Club (SCBC) is the rowing club of Somerville College, Oxford. The club was formed in 1921 as one of the first women's clubs on the Isis, however was unable to compete in bumps until 1969. The women's team has won the title Head of the River eight times in Summer Eights and five times in Torpids, more than any other women's rowing team from the University of Oxford.

Due to fears that it might harm their reproductive abilities, women's rowing clubs were banned until 1921. A member of the club was first permitted to take part in Summer Eights in 1927, following the rejection of an earlier request in 1922.

Now there are 6 women's divisions in Summer Eights and racing in the top divisions is as competitive as the men's. However, when women were first given their own division, only 12 colleges competed - Somerville, as an all women's college, was one of them. Within four years the W1 were Head of the River.

Somerville College Boat Club shares the University College Boathouse with University College, St Peter's College and Wolfson College. The building is owned by University College and won a Royal Institute of British Architects prize and has enjoyed a very favourable reception in the architectural world.

Notable alumni 
Somerville College Boat Club has produced four Olympic rowers:
Fiona Freckleton, bronze medalist in the Women's Pairs at the 1991 World Rowing Championships in Vienna  - Great Britain's first medal in a major World Championship women's rowing event - also competed at the 1992 Summer Olympics and 1993 World Rowing Championships.
Patricia Reid also competed at the 1992 Summer Olympics, having achieved silver and bronze at the 1986 Commonwealth Games.
Luka Grubor, gold medalist at the 2000 Summer Olympics, 2002 World Rowing Championships and 1993 Nations Cup, silver medalist at the 1999 World Rowing Championships.
Jennifer Goldsack, competed at the 2008 Summer Olympics; gold medalist at the 2011 Pan American Games and silver medalist at the 2007 World Rowing Championships.

Other notable members of the SCBC were Lucy Sutherland and Dominica Legge.

References

External links

Somerville College, Oxford
Rowing clubs of the University of Oxford
Sports clubs established in 1921
1921 establishments in England
Rowing clubs in Oxfordshire
Rowing clubs of the River Thames